In behavioral ecology, hyperphagia is a short-term increase in food intake and metabolization in response to changing environmental conditions. It is most prominent in a number of migratory bird species. Hyperphagia occurs when fat deposits need to be built up over the course of a few days or weeks, for example in wintering birds that are preparing to start on their spring migration, or when feeding habitat conditions improve for only a short duration. Mallards may engage in hyperphagia in response to winter floods that temporarily make available more wetlands for foraging, heavily increasing their daily food intake to make use of the additional food.

References

Behavioral ecology